The thunderbird is a legendary creature in particular North American indigenous peoples' history and culture. It is considered a supernatural being of power and strength.

It is especially important and frequently depicted in the art, songs, and oral histories of many Pacific Northwest Coast cultures, but is also found in various forms among some peoples of the American Southwest, East Coast of the United States, Great Lakes, and Great Plains. In modern times it has achieved notoriety as a purported cryptid, similar to creatures such as Bigfoot and the Loch Ness Monster.

General description 
The thunderbird is said to create thunder by flapping its wings (Algonquian), and lightning by flashing its eyes (Algonquian, Iroquois).

Algonquian 

The thunderbird myth and motif is prevalent among Algonquian peoples in the "Northeast", i.e., Eastern Canada (Ontario, Quebec, and eastward) and Northeastern United States, and the Iroquois peoples (surrounding the Great Lakes). The discussion of the "Northeast" region has included Algonquian-speaking people in the Lakes-bordering U.S. Midwest states (e.g., Ojibwe in Minnesota).

In Algonquian mythology, the thunderbird controls the upper world while the underworld is governed by the underwater panther or Great Horned Serpent. The thunderbird creates not just thunder (with its wing-flapping) but lightning bolts, which it casts at the underworld creatures.

Thunderbirds in this tradition may be depicted as a spreadeagled bird (wings horizontal head in profile), but also quite common with the head facing forward, thus presenting an X-shaped appearance overall (see under §Iconography below).

Ojibwe

The Ojibwe version of the myth states that the thunderbirds were created by Nanabozho to fight the underwater spirits. Thunderbirds also punished humans who broke moral rules. The thunderbirds lived in the four directions and arrived with the other birds in the springtime. In the fall, they migrated south after the end of the underwater spirits' most dangerous season.

Menominee

The Menominee of Northern Wisconsin tell of a great mountain that floats in the western sky on which dwell the thunderbirds. They control the rain and hail, and delight in fighting and deeds of greatness. They are the enemies of the great horned snakes (the Misikinubik) and have prevented these from overrunning the earth and devouring humankind. They are messengers of the Great Sun himself.

Siouan

The thunderbird motif is also seen in Siouan-speaking peoples, which include tribes traditionally occupying areas around the Great Lakes.

Ho-Chunk
Ho-Chunk tradition states that a man who has a vision of a thunderbird during a solitary fast will become a war chief of the people.

Arikara 

Ethnographer George Amos Dorsey transcribed a tale from the Arikaras with the title The Boy who befriended the Thunderbirds and the Serpent: a boy named Antelope-Carrier finds a nest with four young thunderbirds; their mother comes and tells the human boy that a two-headed Serpent comes out of the lake to eat the young.

Iconography

X-shapes 
In Algonquian images, an X-shaped thunderbird is often used to depict the thunderbird with its wings alongside its body and the head facing forwards instead of in profile.

The depiction may be stylized and simplified. A headless X-shaped thunderbird was found on an Ojibwe midewiwin disc dating to 1250–1400 CE. In an 18th-century manuscript (a "daybook" ledger) written by the namesake grandson of Governor Matthew Mayhew, the thunderbird pictograms varies from "recognizable birds to simply an incised X".

Non-indigenous scientific interpretations

American science historian and folklorist Adrienne Mayor and British historian Tom Holland have both suggested that indigenous thunderbird stories are based on discoveries of pterosaur fossils by Native Americans. However, it has also been noted that, despite variations, the typical design elements of the motif within different tribal groups across the continent appear distinct from the makeup of the suggested prehistoric flying reptile, such as eagle or raptor-like avian feathered wings and tail, along with a vastly different head shape, perhaps with the exception of some Pacific Northwest imagery.

In modern usage
 Thunderbird is the name of an operator in the popular competitive shooter Tom Clancy's Rainbow Six: Siege.
 The Ford Thunderbird took its name from the Thunderbird.
 In 1925, Aleuts were recorded as using the term to describe the Douglas World Cruiser aircraft which passed through Atka on the first aerial circumnavigation by a US Army team the previous year.
 The Pokémon Zapdos is based on First Nations folklore surrounding the Thunderbird.
 The Thunderbird is part of the Harry Potter franchise, and plays a significant role in Fantastic Beasts and Where to Find Them.

See also

 Lightning bird
 Pamola
 Piasa
 Rain Bird
 Raven (mythology)
 Roc (mythology)
 Thunder god
 Timeline of pterosaur research

References

Sources

External links 
 
 

First Nations culture
Kwakwaka'wakw mythology
Legendary birds
Legendary creatures of the indigenous peoples of North America
Mississippian culture
Mythological birds of prey
Native American culture
Native American religion
Northwest Coast art
Thunder deities